The Alajuela 38 is an American sailboat that was designed by William Atkin as a cruiser and first built in 1977.

The Alajuela 38 is a development of an earlier Atkin design, the Ingrid 38 and the Goucho. Versions of the design were also built by many other builders using an assortment of materials for hull construction, including wood and ferro-cement.

Production
The design was built by the Alajuela Yacht Corp in the United States. The company completed about 72 examples of the design between 1977 and 1985, including some boats delivered as bare hulls and kits for owner-completion. Some boats were completed to this design built from wood or using a ferrocement hull. The number reported as completed varies, depending on whether boats sold as bare hulls or kits are counted. The number is thought to be between 70 and 80.

The boat was the company's first design produced and it took founder Mike Riding almost four years to build the hull molds for the start of production.

Design
The Alajuela 38 is a recreational keelboat, built predominantly of fiberglass, with wood trim. It has a cutter rig, a spooned raked stem with a teak bowsprit, a canoe transom, a transom-hung rudder controlled by a tiller, or an optional wheel and a fixed long keel. It displaces  and carries  of lead ballast.

Sleeping accommodations are provided for five people. These include a "V"-berth in the bow cabin, plus two settee berths and a pilot berth in the main cabin. The galley is "U"-shaped and located on the starboard side at the foot of the companionway steps. In includes a top-loading icebox and a two-burner propane-fueled stove. There is a navigation station aft. A wet locker is mounted between the aft engine room and the galley. The cabin has a teak and holly sole and is finished in teak wood, with a planked ceiling. The head is located just aft of the bow cabin, on the starboard side. The stern lazarette provides vented storage for propane tanks.

Ventilation is provided by four teak ventilators, plus an optional teak skylight.

For sailing there are three two-speed winches for the halyards and five two-speed winches for the sheets. Tracks are provided for the genoa and the staysail sheets. The mainsheet has a mechanical advantage of 6:1 and employs with a mainsheet traveler. The outhaul is an internally mounted design, with a 2:1 advantage. The cockpit coamings are of teak. The boat can be equipped with a spinnaker.

Operational history
In a 1994 review Richard Sherwood wrote, "this is a passage or cruising boat, not a racer. Long keel gives directional stability, but Alajuela will not turn on a dime. Double-enders offer less area to pooping seas and are intended for cruising. Alajuela has a fast-draining, relatively small cockpit for insurance."

See also
List of sailing boat types

Related development
Alajuela 33

Similar sailboats
C&C 38
Catalina 38 
Columbia 38
Eagle 38
Farr 38
Hunter 380
Hunter 386
Landfall 38
Sabre 38
Shannon 38
Yankee 38

References

Keelboats
1970s sailboat type designs
Sailing yachts
Sailboat type designs by William Atkin
Sailboat types built by Alajuela Yacht Corp